Lakeport may refer to:

Places in the United States
 Lakeport, Arkansas
 Lakeport, California
 Lakeport, Florida
 Lakeport, Michigan
 Lakeport, New Hampshire
 Lakeport, New York, a hamlet in the town of Sullivan, New York
 Lakeport, Texas
 Lakeport, Wisconsin
 Lakeport Township, Hubbard County, Minnesota
 Lakeport, a fictional, presumably Northeastern, city, home of the Bobbsey Twins

Other
 Lakeport Brewing Company, a brewery in Hamilton, Ontario